Trisetum sibiricum is a species of flowering plant belonging to the family Poaceae.

Its native range is Eurasia and Northern America.

References

sibiricum